"Idee stupide" (Stupid ideas) is the fourth and last single released by Fabri Fibra from his third solo studio album: Tradimento, recorded in 2006. This song is in collaboration with the singer Diego Mancino.

Diatribe with Gemelli Diversi
In this song, Fibra criticized offensively Grido (rapper) of Gemelli Diversi. In August 2006, Grido responds to Fabri Fibra with the song Standing Ovation, sung on the basis of Applausi per Fibra. Fabri Fibra used to answer a new version of Oh Yeah Mr. Sympatia, performed live on the stage of MTV Day 2006, in Bologna.

References 

2006 singles
Fabri Fibra songs
2006 songs
Songs written by Fabri Fibra